Saint-Lys (Sent Lis in gascon occitan) is a commune in the Haute-Garonne department in southwestern France.

Population
The inhabitants of Saint-Lys are known as Saint-Lysiens in French.

See also
Communes of the Haute-Garonne department

References

Communes of Haute-Garonne